This is the list of cathedrals in East Timor.

Roman Catholic
Cathedrals of the Roman Catholic Church in East Timor:
 St. Anthony Cathedral, Baucau
 Cathedral of the Immaculate Conception in Díli
 Sacred Heart Cathedral, Maliana

See also

List of cathedrals

References

Cathedrals in East Timor
East Timor
Cathedrals
Cathedrals